This is a list of notable folk dance performance groups, listed by country of origin.

Bulgaria
Pirin Folk Ensemble

Canada
Chai Folk Ensemble
Cheremosh Ukrainian Dance Company

China
China National Ethnic Song and Dance Ensemble

Croatia
National Folk Dance Ensemble of Croatia LADO

Estonia
University of Tartu Folk Art Ensemble

Honduras
Ballet Folklórico de Honduras Oro Lenca

Mexico
Ballet Folklorico Aztlan
Ballet Folklorico de Mexico

Philippines
Bayanihan Philippine National Folk Dance Company
Ramon Obusan Folkloric Group

Poland
Mazowsze
Śląsk Song and Dance Ensemble

Turkey
Fire of Anatolia

Ukraine
P. Virsky Ukrainian National Folk Dance Ensemble

United States
American Indian Dance Theatre
Ballet Folklorico Paso Del Norte
Brigham Young University Folk Dance Ensemble
Duquesne University Tamburitzans
Mandala folk dance ensemble

Folk dance companies